is a railway station on the Senmō Main Line in Kiyosato, Hokkaido, Japan, operated by the Hokkaido Railway Company (JR Hokkaido).

Lines
Sattsuru Station is served by the Senmō Main Line, and is numbered B68.

Adjacent stations

External links
 JR Hokkaido Sattsuru Station information 

Stations of Hokkaido Railway Company
Railway stations in Hokkaido Prefecture
Railway stations in Japan opened in 1929